Milhojas ("thousand sheets") are desserts made with stacked layers of puff pastry, filled with creme patissiere; cream; dulce de leche; a creamy mix of condensed milk, sugar, and vanilla; or white chocolate. They are part of the cuisines of Spain, Argentina, Bolivia, Ecuador, Colombia, Chile, El Salvador, Guatemala, Mexico, Peru, Portugal, UK (Gibraltar), Uruguay, and Venezuela. It is a type of mille feuille.

See also

Mille-feuille
List of pastries

References

 Rick Stein's Spain: 140 new recipes inspired by my journey off the beaten track – Rick Stein. pp. 403–404.

Desserts
Argentine pastries
Colombian cuisine
Chilean cuisine
Guatemalan cuisine
Peruvian cuisine
Portuguese cuisine
Salvadoran cuisine
Spanish pastries
Venezuelan pastries
Mexican pastries